A padded cell is a cell in a psychiatric hospital with cushions lining the walls. The padding is an attempt to prevent patients from hurting themselves by hitting their head (or other bodily parts) on the hard surface of the walls.  In most cases, an individual's placement in a padded cell is involuntary.

Other names used are "rubber room", seclusion room, time out room, calming room, quiet room, or personal safety room.

Use
The length of time patients were kept in a padded cell varied greatly. Some patients remained locked in a padded cell for several days. A patient might also be made to wear a straitjacket if they were considered at risk of self-harm.

The use of padded cells and straitjackets declined drastically following the introduction of psychotropic drugs in the 1950s. Personal Safety Rooms are still used throughout the world and can be beneficial in providing a safe environment for not only occupants but also staff, and can prevent work-related injuries in the facilities.

A reconstructed padded cell is maintained at the Mental Health Museum, Fieldhead Hospital, Wakefield, UK.

Current practice

In the UK, seclusion is defined by the Mental Health Act 1983 Code of Practice as: "the supervised confinement of a patient in a room, which may be locked. Its sole aim is to contain severely disturbed behaviour that is likely to cause harm to others." The Code of Practice (paragraph 26.109) says that a seclusion room should only be used for that purpose and should have the following features:

"Allow for communication with the patient when the patient is in the room and the door is locked, for example, via an intercom
Include limited furnishings, which should include a bed, pillow, mattress and blanket or covering
Have no apparent safety hazards
Have robust, reinforced window(s) that provide natural light (where possible the window should be positioned to enable a view outside)
Have externally controlled lighting, including a main light and subdued lighting for night time
Have robust door(s) which open outwards
Have externally controlled heating and/or air conditioning, which enables those observing the patient to monitor the room temperature
Have no blind spots and alternate viewing panels should be available where required
Always have a clock visible to the patient from within the room
Have access to toilet and washing facilities"

References

External links 
 TheTimeChamber - History and photographs of Padded Cells in Great Britain
 rubber room (USA)  and padded room (UK)  photos in abandoned hospitals

Psychiatric restraint
Rooms
Psychiatric hospitals